Selim Palyani (born April 5, 1976) is a boxer from Turkey, who won the bronze medal in the Men's Lightweight (– 60 kg) division at the 2000 European Amateur Boxing Championships in Tampere, Finland.

Palyani represented his native country at the 2000 Summer Olympics in Sydney, Australia. There he was stopped in the quarterfinals of the Men's Lightweight division by Russia's eventual bronze medalist Alexandr Maletin.

References
 sports-reference

1976 births
Living people
Lightweight boxers
Boxers at the 2000 Summer Olympics
Olympic boxers of Turkey
Turkish male boxers